Idol 2009 was the sixth season of the Swedish idol series and was broadcast by TV 4. The jury, identical to the previous year, consisted of Anders Bagge, Laila Bagge and Andreas Carlsson. Peter Jihde, the show's host, was also a continuation of the previous year's cast. The audition cities visited during the spring of 2009 were Gothenburg, Gävle, Malmö, Stockholm and Umeå, respectively. Around 11,000 people applied for Idol 2009, establishing a new Swedish record.

During auditions in Stockholm on 25 April, Idol 2008 winner Kevin Borg performed for the candidates, as well as Johan Palm who finished fourth in Idol 2008. In Gothenburg, Erik Segerstedt from Idol 2006 performed; and in Malmö, Sibel from Idol 2005. In Gävle, Idol 2008 runner-up Alice Svensson sang to the applicants; and in Umeå, Daniel Lindström from Idol 2004.

After the final of Idol 2008, the Idol producers said in a video on TV4's website that "Idol 2009 will be bigger than ever!" at the same time confirming that Idol would come back again during 2009. On 18 March TV4 published times and places for the year's audition tour. The programme started broadcasting on 8 September 2009.

After each show a program called "Idol: Eftersnack" was to be sent on TV400. As with the previous year, Katrin Zytomierska and Peter Jihde were the hosts.

On 15 October 2009, it was announced that the participant Erika Selin sang the demo for the song "Run", which would participate in Sweden's national selection "Melodifestivalen 2010" for Eurovision Song Contest 2010. A possible involvement in the festival, however, did not interfere with her participation in Idol.

In 2010, Clara was recruited to a newly started project with Jonas Berggren and Ulf Ekberg from Ace of Base. Clara was to share lead vocals with Julia Williamson. The first single from their album was released in September 2010.

Changes/news
 Quarterfinals and semifinals of Idol 2009 were to be broadcast from Malmö and Gothenburg, while the grand finale was to be aired from Ericsson Globe in Stockholm.
 Anders Bagge was out on his own audition tour to find ten new talents, who didn't apply "the usual way" for Idol.
 The vignette that appeared in the beginning and end of each Idol episode and also before and after each advertising break was updated. Between 2005 and 2008, it was a rapper who told who sponsored the program.
 The two participants in the weekly finals which received the fewest votes were made to sing their songs again. Their previous votes were removed and a new round of voting decided who would leave.

Judges
Anders Bagge
Laila Bagge
Andreas Carlsson

Hosts
Peter Jihde – Host during Idol and Idol Eftersnack
Katrin Zytomierska – Host during Idol Eftersnack

Competitors
Below is a list of the nineteen jury-selected qualifiers. Before the qualifiers, the viewers got to decide whether Calle Kristiansson or Piotr Pawel Pospiech would move to the qualifying week. Viewers chose Calle Kristiansson as the 20th competitor. Those marked in bold are the ones which viewers chose to forward to the weekly finals. (The jury chose four of these, a total of 11 contestants.)

Andréas Johansson, 19, Piteå
Calle Kristiansson, 21, Kristianstad
Camilla Håkansson, 21, Kalix
Carl Chapal, 29, Gothenburg
Clara Hagman, 18, Gävle
Eddie Razaz, 20, Stockholm
Erik Grönwall, 21, Stockholm
Erika Selin, 18, Dorotea
Jon Sindenius, 21, Västerås
Karolina Brånsgård, 25, Örebro
Mariette Hansson, 26, Halmstad
Moa Carlebecker Forssell, 20, Växjö
Nicklas Hocker, 17, Onsala
Nicolle Walles, 17, Stockholm
Patrik Öhlund, 37, Piteå
Rabih Jaber, 22, Lycksele
Rasmus Ingdahl, 21, Stockholm
Reza Ningtyas Lindh, 28, Lund
Sabina Täck, 19, Lessebo
Tove Östman Styrke, 16, Umeå

Semi-finals
20 participants remained for the final audition week in Stockholm. These were divided into four groups, two for men and two for women respectively. After the last episode of the week, 11 of the 20 remained and were chosen to compete for the title "Idol 2009". Those who are in bold are the ones viewers voted for the qualifying finals. The contestants are listed in the order they appeared during each night.

Semifinal 1
Was aired on 28 September 2009.
 Calle Kristiansson, 21 years, Kristianstad – "Highway to Hell" (AC/DC)
 Nicklas Hocker, 17 years, Onsala – "Blood Is Thicker Than Water" (Black Label Society)
 Andréas Johansson, 19 years, Piteå – "Hurtful" (Erik Hassle)
 Eddie Razaz, 20 years, Stockholm – "Man in the Mirror" (Michael Jackson)
 Jon Sindenius, 21 years, Västerås – "Mama I'm Coming Home" (Ozzy Osbourne)

Semifinal 2
Was aired on 29 September 2009.
 Sabina Täck, 19 years, Lessebo – "Ain't No Other Man" (Christina Aguilera)
 Moa Carlebecker, 20 years, Växjö – "The Story" (Brandi Carlile)
 Clara Hagman, 18 years, Gävle – "Release me" (Oh Laura)
 Mariette Hansson, 26 years, Halmstad – "Dear Mr President" (Pink)
 Erika Selin, 18 years, Dorotea – "Bless the Broken Road" (Rascal Flatts)

Semifinal 3
Was aired on 30 September 2009.
 Patrik Öhlund, 37 years, Piteå – With or Without You (U2)
 Rasmus Ingdahl, 21 years, Stockholm – I'm Yours (Jason Mraz)
 Carl Chapal, 29 years, Göteborg – Keep This Fire Burning (Robyn)
 Rabih Jaber, 22 years, Lycksele – With You (Chris Brown)
 Erik Grönwall, 21 years, Stockholm – Is It True (Yohanna)

Semifinal 4
Was aired on 1 October 2009.
 Nicolle Walles, 17 years, Stockholm – The Best (Tina Turner)
 Reza Ningtyas Lindh, 28 years, Lund – Listen (Beyoncé)
 Camilla Håkansson, 21 years, Kalix – My Heart Will Go On (Céline Dion)
 Karolina Brånsgård, 25 years, Örebro – It's a Man's World (James Brown)
 Tove Östman Styrke, 16 years, Umeå –  All These Things I've Done (The Killers)

Qualifying finals
The qualifying finals aired on 2 October 2009. In the final qualifying program 12 people competed for 11 seats in the weekly finals. Viewers had chosen 8 contestants for the qualifying final and the judges chose 4 wildcards to participate in the qualifying finals. The person in bold was eliminated.
 Erik Grönwall, 21 years, Stockholm – Beat It (Michael Jackson)
 Reza Ningtyas Lindh, 28 years, Lund – Son of a Preacher Man (Dusty Springfield)
 Erika Selin, 18 years, Dorotea – Show Me Heaven (Maria McKee)
 Calle Kristiansson, 21 years, Kristianstad – Here I Go Again (Whitesnake)
 Nicklas Hocker, 17 years, Onsala – Oh Pretty Woman (Gary Moore)
 Tove Östman Styrke, 16 years, Umeå – Life on Mars (David Bowie)
 Jon Sindenius, 21 years, Västerås – Don't Look Back in Anger (Oasis)
 Eddie Razaz, 20 years, Stockholm – Hurtful (Erik Hassle)
 Karolina Brånsgård, 25 years, Örebro – Fever (Peggy Lee, Little Willie John)
 Rabih Jaber, 22 years, Lycksele – Stand by Me (Ben E. King)
 Mariette Hansson, 26 years, Halmstad – Sweet Child o' Mine (Guns N' Roses)
 Camilla Håkansson, 21 years, Kalix – Hallelujah (Leonard Cohen)

The judges wildcards to the qualifying finals
 Reza Ningtyas Lindh
 Nicklas Hocker
 Eddie Razaz
 Camilla Håkansson

Finals
11 individuals competed for nine Fridays until the grand final in Globen, held on 11 December 2009. Artists marked with bold were excluded from the contest.

Week 1: Club Idol
The first final week was broadcast on 9 October 2009. The Idol 2004 participant Darin began the program by singing his cover of Coldplay's hit song "Viva La Vida" from 2008.

 Nicklas Hocker – Get This Party Started (Pink)
 Rabih Jaber – When Love Takes Over (David Guetta & Kelly Rowland)
 Karolina Brånsgård – Just Dance (Lady Gaga)
 Erika Selin – About You Now (Sugababes)
 Calle Kristiansson – Destiny Calling (Melody Club)
 Reza Ningtyas Lindh – Superstar (Jamelia)
 Erik Grönwall – Leave a Light On (Belinda Carlisle)
 Camilla Håkansson – All Night Long (Lionel Richie)
 Eddie Razaz – Release Me (Agnes)
 Mariette Hansson – When Tomorrow Comes (Eurythmics)
 Tove Östman Styrke – Hot N Cold (Katy Perry)

Elimination
The two participants who received the fewest viewer votes had to sing a second time.
The person who is marked with a dark gray background had the lowest number of votes and was forced to leave Idol.

Week 2: Michael Jackson
The second final week was broadcast on 16 October 2009. The American Idol winner Jordin Sparks and Swedish Idol 2008 winner Kevin Borg began the program by together singing her and Chris Brown's song No Air from 2008. The participants also sang together We Are The World by Michael Jackson & Lionel Richie. At the end of the program (in the elimination round), Jordin Sparks sang her newest song S.O.S.

 Calle Kristiansson – Bad (Michael Jackson)
 Camilla Håkansson – Human Nature (Michael Jackson)
 Reza Ningtyas Lindh – The Way You Make Me Feel (Michael Jackson)
 Mariette Hansson – I Want You Back (The Jackson 5)
 Eddie Razaz – They Don't Care About Us (Michael Jackson)
 Tove Östman Styrke – Will You Be There (Michael Jackson)
 Nicklas Hocker – Black or White (Michael Jackson)
 Rabih Jaber – You Are Not Alone (Michael Jackson)
 Erika Selin – Beat It (Michael Jackson)
 Erik Grönwall – Thriller (Michael Jackson)

Elimination
The two participants who received the fewest viewer votes had to sing a second time.
The person who is marked with a dark gray background had the lowest number of votes and was forced to leave Idol.

Week 3: Rock
The third final week was broadcast on 23 October 2009. The season's first guest judge was Joey Tempest, from rock band Europe.

 Erik Grönwall – Why Can't This Be Love (Van Halen)
 Eddie Razaz – Beautiful Day (U2)
 Erika Selin – Here Without You (3 Doors Down)
 Mariette Hansson – I'm Just a Girl (No Doubt)
 Rabih Jaber – Driving One of Your Cars (Lisa Miskovsky)
 Tove Östman Styrke – We're Not Living in America (The Sounds)
 Nicklas Hocker – Black Hole Sun (Soundgarden)
 Reza Ningtyas Lindh – Don't Stop Me Now (Queen)
 Calle Kristiansson – Are You Gonna Go My Way (Lenny Kravitz)

Elimination
The two participants who received the fewest viewer votes had to sing a second time.
The person who is marked with a dark gray background had the lowest number of votes and was forced to leave Idol.

Week 4: Las Vegas
The fourth final week was broadcast on 30 October 2009. The contestants began the program singing Katy Perry's song Waking Up in Vegas with the jury member Andreas Carlsson; at the same time Laila Bagge was dancing with her dance partner Tobias Wallin from Let's Dance 2009.

 Tove Östman Styrke – Mack the knife (Bobby Darin)
 Calle Kristiansson – It's not unusual (Tom Jones)
 Reza Ningtyas Lindh – New York City (Liza Minnelli)
 Eddie Razaz – Can't take my eyes of off you (Frankie Valli & The Four Seasons)
 Erika Selin – Sway (Perez Prado & Rosemary Clooney)
 Erik Grönwall – You don't have to say you love me (Dusty Springfield)
 Mariette Hansson – You to Me Are Everything (The Real Thing)
 Rabih Jaber – That's amore (Dean Martin)

Elimination
The two participants who received the fewest viewer votes had to sing a second time.
The person who is marked with a dark gray background had the lowest number of votes and was forced to leave Idol.

Week 5: Världens bästa låt
The fifth final week was broadcast on 6 November 2009.

 Rabih Jaber –  All my life (K-Ci & JoJo)
 Mariette Hansson –  Because the night (Bruce Springsteen)
 Reza Ningtyas Lindh – Summertime (Fantasia Barrino)
 Calle Kristiansson –  With a little help from my friends (Joe Cocker)
 Tove Östman Styrke – In the ghetto (Elvis Presley)
 Eddie Razaz –  If you're not the one (Daniel Bedingfield)
 Erik Grönwall – The show must go on (Queen)

Elimination
The two participants who received the fewest viewer votes had to sing a second time.
The person who is marked with a dark gray background had the lowest number of votes and was forced to leave Idol.

Week 6: Topplistan
The sixth final week was broadcast on 13 November 2009. This week the jury member Anders Bagge was ill, therefore he was replaced by the Ace of Base-member Ulf Ekberg.

 Erik Grönwall – Bodies (Robbie Williams)
 Eddie Razaz – Curly Sue (Takida)
 Reza Ningtyas Lindh – Halo (Beyoncé)
 Calle Kristiansson – Bad Day (Daniel Powter)
 Tove Östman Styrke – I Wish I was a Punkrocker (Sandi Thom)
 Mariette Hansson – Bleeding Love (Leona Lewis)

 Reza Ningtyas Lindh & Eddie Razaz – If only You (Danny Saucedo & Therese Grankvist)
 Mariette Hansson & Calle Kristiansson – Someone New (Eskobar & Heather Nova)
 Tove Östman Styrke & Erik Grönwall – Kids (Robbie Williams & Kylie Minogue)

Elimination
The two participants who received the fewest viewer votes had to sing a second time.
The person who is marked with a dark gray background had the lowest number of votes and was forced to leave Idol.

Week 7: Kärlek
The seventh final week was broadcast on 20 November 2009. This was the last week Idol 2009 was to be broadcast from the Idol Studio in Stockholm.

Song 1, tribute to the fans:
 Tove Östman Styrke – Sweet Dreams (Eurythmics)
 Calle Kristiansson – To Be with You (Mr. Big)
 Erik Grönwall – My Life Would Suck Without You (Kelly Clarkson)
 Reza Ningtyas Lindh – You've Got a Friend (Carole King)
 Mariette Hansson – Good Riddance (Time of Your Life) (Green Day)

Song 2, tribute to one or more relatives:
 Tove Östman Styrke – Himlen är oskyldigt blå (Ted Gärdestad)
 Calle Kristiansson – Your Song (Elton John)
 Erik Grönwall – Always (Bon Jovi)
 Reza Ningtyas Lindh – When I Need You (Leo Sayer, Céline Dion)
 Mariette Hansson – Ängeln i rummet (Eva Dahlgren)

Elimination
The two participants who received the fewest viewer votes had to sing a second time.
The person who is marked with a dark gray background had the lowest number of votes and was forced to leave Idol.

Week 8: Arena
The eighth final week was to be broadcast on 27 November 2009 from Malmö Arena in Malmö.

Song 1:
 Calle Kristiansson – Hungry Heart (Bruce Springsteen)
 Mariette Hansson – Land of Confusion (Genesis)
 Tove Östman Styrke – Pride (U2)
 Erik Grönwall – Shout It Out Loud (Kiss)

Song 2:
 Calle Kristiansson – Jumpin' Jack Flash (The Rolling Stones)
 Mariette Hansson – You're the Storm (The Cardigans)
 Tove Östman Styrke – Since You Been Gone (Russ Ballard, Head East, Rainbow)
 Erik Grönwall – Hey Jude (The Beatles)

Elimination
The two participants who received the fewest viewer votes had to sing a second time.
The person who is marked with a dark gray background had the lowest number of votes and was forced to leave Idol.

Week 9: Jury's Choice
The ninth final week was to be broadcast on 4 December 2009 from Scandinavium in Gothenburg.

Song 1:
 Calle Kristiansson – Walking in Memphis (Marc Cohn)
 Erik Grönwall – Heaven (Bryan Adams)
 Tove Östman Styrke – Can't Get You Out of My Head (Kylie Minogue)

Song 2:
 Calle Kristiansson – Do Ya Think I'm Sexy (Rod Stewart)
 Erik Grönwall – Run to the Hills (Iron Maiden)
 Tove Östman Styrke – The Greatest Love of All (George Benson/Whitney Houston)

Elimination
The two participants who received the fewest viewer votes had to sing a second time.
The person who is marked with a dark gray background had the lowest number of votes and was forced to leave Idol.

Week 10: The final
The tenth and last final week was to be broadcast on 11 December 2009 from Ericsson Globe in Stockholm. Former "Idol" winner Agnes was to attend the final to perform.

Song 1:
 Calle Kristiansson – Rock and roll (Led Zeppelin)
 Erik Grönwall – The final countdown (Europe)

Song 2:
 Calle Kristiansson – With a little help from my friends (Joe Cocker)
 Erik Grönwall – The show must go on (Queen)

Song 3:
 Calle Kristiansson – Higher (Calle Kristiansson)
 Erik Grönwall – Higher (Erik Grönwall)
Lists below the participant who received the largest number of viewer votes and thus won Idol 2009.

Elimination Chart

Idol 2009 album

Det bästa från Idol 2009 (The Best from Idol 2009) is a sampling Swedish Idol 2009 shows.

References

2009 Swedish television seasons
Season 06
2009 in Swedish music